Bank Melli Iran (BMI; , Bânk-e Melli-ye Irân) is the first national and commercial retail bank of Iran. It is considered as the largest Iranian company in terms of annual income with a revenue of 364 657 billion Rials in 2016. It is the largest bank in the Islamic world and in the Middle East. By the end of 2016, BMI had a net asset of $76.6 billion and a vast network of 3.328 banking branches; so it is known as the largest Iranian bank based on the amount of assets. The brand of BMI was recognized as one of the 100 top Iranian brands in 10th National Iranian Heroes Championship in 2013. The National Bank has 3328 active branches inside, 14 active branches and 4 sub-stations abroad and it has 180 booths. Also, the first foreign branch of BMI was opened in Hamburg, Germany in 1948.

History 
The formation of a new bank was first proposed by Haj Mohammad Hassan Amin Dar al-Zarb known as Amināl-Zarb (one of the great Tehran stockholders) in 1879 ten years before the creation of the King Bank, to Naser-al-Din Shah Qajar. But this proposal was not accepted with the interference of the countries that dominated Iran and their agents. Instead, the King Bank was established in Iran. After the establishment of the constitution, when the government allowed the National Assembly to allow external borrowing, the national feelings were excited that had been hurt by past loans and the behavior of foreign banks. So, the deputies demanded the establishment of the National Bank in order to curtail the political and economic influence of said banks and restore the treasury finances while opposing external borrowing. A group of traders and merchants committed to participate in the bank. Thus, it was published with a statement that showed the general feelings and popular interest in establishing a national credit bank in Iran in December 1906.

On 23 November 1906, Mirza Abolqasem Nasser al-Malik, the Minister of Finance of the time of Muzaffar al-Din Shah, was present in the National Assembly. He announced the financial crisis of the country. He suggested that the government get a loan from European countries to deal with this problem, but the deputies dissented strongly. After that, on 9 December, the deputies agreed to establish a bank that could benefit the country and work with people's deposits in the interests of the country and the people. The news of Bank Melli formation with a capital of 15 million (300 million) that could be increased to 50 million Tomans faced with the nation's eagerness.

On the other hand, sudden changes in the political situation and the 1907 agreement between the governments of Russia and Britain and the division of Iran, as well as the beginning of the First World War and the arrival of occupation forces in Iran, have undermined all efforts to form the National Bank. This great wish of people was postponed for many years. Finally, by the end of First World War and withdrawal of invaders from Iran, the law for establishing the National Bank of Iran was approved by the parliament on 14 May 1927. The statute of bank was approved by the Parliament's Finance Committee on 14 July 1928. Thus, the National Bank of Iran officially started its work in Tehran on Tuesday, 20 September 1928.

The first CEO of the National Bank, Kurt Lindenblatt, and his vice-president, Fogel, came to Iran with 70 experts from Germany.

According to the statute of bank, the National Bank of Iran was recognized as joint-stock company with legal personality; it was considered to be subject to commercial laws. The initial capital of the bank was 20 million Rials, of which only 8 million were paid. In 1935, the bank's capital increased to 300 million Rials and in 1952 it was increased to 2 billion Rials, all of which was paid. At present, it is 187 trillion Rials with an increase in 2016.

Due to the fact that there were no bank specialists in Iran at that time, the law allowed the recruitment of Swiss or German nationals for the administration of the bank. The number of bank employees on the opening day, including Iranian and German, did not exceed 27. Now, the number of employees of BMI is over 45 thousand people.

Initially when the bank was first chartered, in addition to the central branch, two additional domestic branches were also opened, one in the market of Tehran and the other in Bandar-e Bushhehr, the country's most important commercial port. The bank's first official overseas branch abroad opened in 1948 in Hamburg, Germany.

On 22 March 1931, the right to publish the banknote was approved by the National Assembly. It was officially granted to the National Bank of Iran for 10 years, which could be renewed on its own. In April 1932, the first banknote of BMI was issued.

Saving Fund: saving fund of Bank Melli Iran was established under a law to encourage people to save money in 1939. It is one of the active units of the bank after establishment of Islamic banking system as a cash loan.

After the Islamic Revolution 

After the Islamic Revolution, changes to the banking system were implemented in order to conform with Sharia law in the realm of banking and finance. The new law was passed in 1984. Currently, there are more than 3328 active branches inside, 14 active branches and 4 subsidiaries abroad and 180 offices, which has made it one of the strongest financial institutions in Iran.

The 20 Rials Pahlavi coin had two pictures: On one side, there was image of Reza Pahlavi with the words of Reza Shah: Establishment of BMI was one of the long-term wishes of my nation, and on the other side was the image of Mohammad Reza Pahlavi with the written: Establishment of BMI was one of the real foundations of independence of Iran.

Governors
Kurt Lindenblatt, September 1928 - September 1932
Albert Schneider, September 1932 - April 1933
Hossein Ala, April 1933 - March 1934
Reza Gholi Amir Khosrovi, March 1934 - November 1939
Mohamad Ali Farzin, November 1939 - October 1941
Hossein Ala, October 1941 - December 1942
Abul Hassan Ebtehaj, December 1942 - July 1950
Ebrahim Zand, July 1950 - September 1951
Ali Asghar Nasser, September 1951 - July 1952
Mohammad Nassiri, July 1952 - August 1953
Ali Asghar Nasser, September 1953 - April 1957
Ebrahim Kashani, April 1957 - 1960
(Source:)

Museum of BMI 
The Museum of BMI was opened with the presence of Eshaq Jahangiri, the first vice president on 21 July 2017. The Museum of BMI was opened with a collection of exquisite works of art, especially banking treasures from various historical periods of Iran, at savings fund building. The National Bank of Iran has ancient objects from Achaemenid, Sasanian and precious artistic works, including fine paintings, lines, rugs and blankets. So, the objectives of establishing BMI Museum is displaying old and historical banking instruments, as well as gifts from various countries during the activity of BMI. The building of BMI Fund was constructed at Ferdowsi Street in Tehran in 1928; it was registered in the category of national works of Iran on 20 December 2000 by number of 2930. This building was designed by a German architect H. Heinrich, inspired by remained Achaemenid periodic buildings and combination of Iranian and European architecture. In this museum, a comprehensive collection of historical gifts of the bank, office equipment and banknote printing machine, ancient paintings, coins, old banknotes and ceremonial bank items are publicly displayed.

Banknote printing 
On 22 March 1931, the National Assembly handed over the right to BMI to print the banknote for 10 years. Also, it was decided that, after expiration of this period, if this right was not canceled, it would act for next ten years.

Finally, first National Banknotes were issued on 1 April 1932. The banknotes of Imperial Bank and National Bank of Iran were prevalent from that date to three months. The banknotes of BMI have become the only paper money in Iran since July of that year.

By 1960, BMI was issuing banknotes for its economic needs. However, that year, upon establishment of Central Bank of Iran, the exclusive right to issue banknotes was transferred to this bank, which is still ongoing.

Fund 
From the beginning of establishment, BMI was a public company; its initial capital was 20 million Rials divided to 20 thousand shares of thousand Rials (13,500 shares with name and 6,500 anonymous shares). But, the transfer of bank shares to non-state shareholders was banned in 1938. In 1935, the capital of BMI increased to 300 million Rials and increased to 2 billion Rials in 1952.

Due to banking system constraints, the National Bank carried out all duties of Central Bank in the economy before 1956. After establishment of Central Bank of Iran, the duties were assigned to this bank. The last registered capital of National Bank was 198 thousand and 565 billion and 600 million Rials in June 2017.

Social responsibilities 
The activities of BMI in the field of social responsibilities have always been considered from organizational and personnel perspectives. The large family of BMI has always played a role as a cornerstone of society in reviving these tasks, in addition to systemic and official activities.

Social Organizational Responsibilities 

 Public Utilities Projects: At present, the bank has been involved in 39 public utilities project more than 114 billion Rials.
 Children Support.
 Support for cultural and scientific projects.
 Support for sports plans for releasing Diya prisoners .
 School building.

Islamic banking

All banks in Iran must follow the banking principles and practices described in the Islamic Banking (Sharia) law of Iran passed in 1983 by the Islamic Majlis of Iran. According to this law, banks can only engage in interest-free Islamic transactions (interest is considered as usury or riba and is forbidden by Islam and its holy book the Quran). The permitted commercial transactions involve exchange of goods and services in return for a share of the assumed profit. All such transactions are performed through Islamic contracts, such as mozarebe, foroush aghsati, joale, salaf, and gharzol-hassane. Details of these contracts and related practices are contained in the Iranian Interest-Free banking law and its guidelines.

Achievements

2017 

 National Statue of Superior Product Innovation "Baam", 2017
 Ranked first in top banking innovations at Dr. Nourbakhsh Festival, 2017
 Selected in Dr. Nourbakhsh Festival in 7@th Annual Conference of Electronic Banking and Payment Systems, 2017
 Acknowledgment of studies center and planning the country's fuel stations 2017
 International Standard Certification ISO 10002: 2014
 Granting the Golden Statue of Public Relations to the National Bank, 2017
 The Ministry of Education's appreciation of BMI function on developing and equipping the schools, 2017
 Appreciation of Foundation of Martyrs and Veterans Affairs, 2017
 Payam Noor University appreciation of Public Relations Office of National Bank of Iran, 2017
 Ministry of Economic and Finance Affairs is honored by Public Relations Office of National Bank of Iran, 2017
 The appreciation of Industry, Mining and Trade Ministry from BMI, 2017
 National Bank of Iran ranked among the top 500 Iranian companies in 2017
 General Director of Mazandaran Blood Transfusion's appreciation of Public Relations of BMI, 2017
 Appreciation of Kahrizak Charity Foundation, 2017
 Statue of Customer Satisfaction at National Conference on the Construction of Iran
 Statue of Public Relations, Industry, National Production Conference
 The title of superior public relations by the branches department of Hamedan province, 2017
 Participation of BMI in thirty-third period of International Qur'an Competitions, 2017

2016 

 Ranked first in top banking innovations at Dr. Nourbakhsh Festival, 2016
 Special Award of the Governor of Tehran in 2016
 obtaining three top ranks among 500 companies, February 2015
 obtaining three top ranks among 500 companies, February 2015
 Gold Statue of Public Relations, Jan. 2015
 Appreciation of First Vice President, "Village Day Meeting"
 Cultural Heritage Organization appreciation of Iran National Bank, October 2015
 10th Public Relations Publicity Festival, 27 August 2015
 Appreciation of Islamic Revolution Housing Foundation from National Bank, 2015
 central bank's appreciation of the National Bank "Chakavak Design", 2015
 governor of Lorestan's appreciation of managing director, May 2015
 the governor of Lorestan and Khorramabad Cities deputy's appreciation of managing director, April 2015

Number of employees 
Serving condition table of BMI employees by gender

National Bank Hospital 
The Hospital of BMI was established to provide health care and to meet the medical needs of its employees in 1938. Following this, the current building of the Bank Hospital was built in 1973. Currently, this unit is located in a 9-story building with an area of about 24,000 square meters; it has 250 beds, about 800 staff, 11 clinics and 14 departments; it uses modern medical equipment to serve the health of the staff of BMI. The health clinics are also located in different locations to meet the needs of the clients in order to provide facilities for those employees of BMI who do not have access to the Bank's Hospital.

Services of National Bank Hospital:

 Providing health care services to employees of BMI and their relatives
 Admission of hospitalized patients and providing medical and paramedical services
 Admission of outpatients and providing relevant services

Financial numbers and statistics

 16 June 2008 (US$1 is approximately 133,130 Iranian rial (Rls)):
Total assets = Rls 360,517 billion
Capitalization = Rls 36,487 billion
Net income after tax = Rls 772 billion
Total loans = Rls 163,595 billion
Number of branches = 3,300
Number of employees  = 43,000
Bank Melli Iran (BMI) has offered close to 30 percent of all credits to economic, production, industrial and services sectors.
Online banking services offered by Bank Melli have registered a 370-percent growth in 2008.

Current CEO and directors

 Abolfazl Najjarzadeh (Acting)

Debts and claims 
Mohammad Reza Hosseinzadeh, director of BMI, announced that the Islamic Republic of Iran owes over 220,000 billion Rials to BMI. In 2009, the announcement of Mahmoud Reza Khavari's talks with ISNA news agency was published on the debt of 50 trillion Rials of Iranian government to the bank and the government's inability to repay the debt. But then, the news of "the government's inability to pay the debt" was denied by Khavari

Significant buildings

Ferdowsi Building – Ferdowsi Avenue, Tehran

Offices
Bank Melli Iran has 18 international branches and services in 11 countries:

 Afghanistan (Kabul)
 Azerbaijan (Baku)
 Bahrain (Manama)
 France (Paris)
 Germany (Hamburg)
 Hong Kong (Hong Kong)
 Iraq (Baghdad & Basra)
 Oman (Muscat)
 Russia (Moscow)
 United Arab Emirates (Abu Dhabi – 4 branches, Dubai – 4 branches and Sharjah)
 United Kingdom (London)

Terrorist bombing
On 26 January 1981, a bomb exploded outside the San Francisco offices of Bank Melli Iran. According to the National Memorial Institute for the Prevention of Terrorism, a bomb exploded at BMI branch in San Francisco, shattering windows and damaging the wall of the building where the explosive was planted. No injuries were reported and no arrests were made.

Bank services

Rial deposits and services 

 housing special plan
 Long-term investment
 Short-term investment
 Normal loan
 Current loan
 Rental boxes
 Guaranteed urban encoder check
 Bank check between banks
 Sale of securities
 Service plan
 Working out bank
 Bank operations forms

Facilities and Rial contracts 

 housing special plan
 Rial Warranty
 Investment plans
 plan execution Ju'alah
 Loan facilities
 villages housing Ju'alah
 house repairs Ju'alah
 car purchase
 Buying basic goods
 Civil partnership contract
 Lease on condition
 Future (forward) contract 
 Mudarabah contract
 Facilities at preferential rate

Deposits and currency facilities 

 Currency guarantee
 Qard Al-Hasan deposit
 Investment deposits
 Terms of opening an account at abroad branches 
 Transferring inventory from abroad branches 
 swift
 Account for companies residing in Iran
 Get a travel currency
 Currency Transfers
 Credits
 Finance / refinance
 Currency Facilities

Electronic Services 

 Real customers systems (edit)
 Internet Banking System "Baam"
 Internet Banking (Saba)
 Melli Baam mobile bank
 Melli Mobile Bank (Hamrah Bank Melli)
 Messenger Yes
 Bank officer
 Internet Service (bill)
 buy charge
 Melli @
 Melli market
 Melli fund
 Request a Facility
 SMS via centralized system (SAPTA)
 Real time gross settlement (RTGS)
 E-bank remittance (SAHAB)
 Collecting and depositing checks (KELLER)
 Tracking the status of non-direct payments
 Tracking the status of assignment checks
 Get the Sheba ID
 Register and track the inconsistency of acceleration
 Electronic toll collection (ETC)
 Security Tips
 Security solutions reducing user-side malware risk

Juridical customers systems 

 Internet Banking SABA (BIB)
 Instantaneous inquiry (SANI)
 Bina system
 Reports system of documents registration organization
 Reporting by Judiciary
 National identity of juridical persons

Other Electronic Bank Services 

 Pay bills
 Telephone Bank
 ATM
 ATM Festival
 Kiosk
 POS terminals
 Shahab Melli Branches
 Night-time bases
 Online Payment Portal Request 
 Internet Payment Gateway ( IPG ) 
 Online stock trading
 Administrative and judicial measures (SIAGH)

Credit Cards 

 Melli Card
 Family Melli Card
 Gift card
 link Card 
 Hilal Ahmar Youth Cards
 Coupon card
 Tourist card
 Other bank cards
 Getting decentralized facilities card number 
 Melli Card Insurance
 Recording problems of receiving the card
 Withdrawal cash from ATM without credit card

Civil lawsuit
Following the September 1997 suicide bombing in Jerusalem, five American students who had been wounded were awarded $251 million in compensatory and punitive damages against the government of Iran and the Iranian Revolutionary Guard Corps by Judge Ricardo M. Urbina, under the Flatow Amendment of the Foreign Sovereign Immunities Act, in accordance with Section 201a of the Terrorism Risk Insurance Act of 2002, which states that "in every case in which a person has obtained a judgment against a terrorist party on a claim based upon an act of terrorism ... the blocked assets of that terrorist party ... shall be subject to execution". Since most Iranian assets in the United States had been withdrawn after the embassy hostage crisis, the only substantial monetary asset left was approximately $150,000 in the Bank Melli's account in the Bank of New York. Before turning over the funds to the five students, however, the Bank of New York sued for a legal decision regarding its responsibilities in the case. The United States Department of Justice, speaking as amicus curiae in support of Bank Melli, advised that the bank had no responsibility for turning the funds over to the students; in March 2006, Judge Denise Cole ruled against them, and was upheld by the Second Circuit Court in April 2007. Bank Melli then withdrew the funds from Bank of New York.

On 5 March 2018, Bank Melli lost an appeal "related to credit card use in Iran" concerning "roughly $17.6 million that Visa Inc and Franklin Resources Inc" were holding for Bank Melli.

United States sanctions
On 25 October 2007, the United States imposed unilateral sanctions against Iran. These sanctions include new measures to reduce Iran's ability to conduct financial transactions between the state-owned banks of Iran and United States citizens or private organisations. Bank Melli was included in these sanctions, on the grounds that, besides its other customers, Bank Melli provides financial services to Iran's nuclear and ballistic missile programmes. A fact sheet released by the US Treasury Department also asserts that between 2002 and 2006 Bank Melli sent at least $100 million to Hamas, Palestinian Islamic Jihad, Hezbollah and other groups, via the Quds Force, a branch of the Iranian Revolutionary Guard.

In a statement published on its web site, BMI refutes the US allegations and categorically denies that it has ever been involved in any "deceptive banking practices".

European Union sanctions
On 16 June 2008, the European Union imposed further unilateral sanctions against Iran. These sanctions will include the European Union freezing the assets of Bank Melli, in response to Tehran's refusal to suspend its uranium enrichment program.
After the lifting of sanctions BMI was the first Iranian bank to be reconnected to Swift.

Subsidiaries

Sadad data company 
In 1999, Sadad Data Company was registered at Companies Registration Office and Non-commercial Enterprises under the number 151478 for an indefinite period of time.

Publishing company of BMI 
After assignment of right to publish banknotes to BMI, a limited organization was created to publish the date of issue on banknotes. This organization evolved along with development of BMI; it was known as "BMI Printing House". This printing house, which was founded by the name of "printing shop" in 1938, gradually became one of the most prestigious printing houses in the country and in the Middle East. The printing needs of branches of BMI were also fulfilling throughout the country in addition to providing print services to government agencies. Printing company of BMI received the publication license from Ministry of Culture and Islamic Guidance in order to allow publication of book and magazine; so it renamed "BMI Printing and Publishing Company".

National Development Group 
The National Development Group's investment is a conglomerate company (cluster company).
Which is accepted on the Tehran Stock Exchange and this cluster company consists of several holding companies (parent company) which includes the following companies

1- Seydko Cement Industries

2- Holding food industry in Behshahr

3- Holding the Iranian Power Plant

4- Holdings of Iran Transfo Group

5- Tangible rubber holding

6- Pharmaceutical holding

7. National Development Investment

8- Arak Petrochemical Industries
Shareholders of National Development Group Investment Company:

The National Bank of Iran owns 71 percent of the company's shares. Other shareholders of the company are as follows

Pension fund and disability pension 8%

Sector Capital Management Services 2%

Tedbir Investment Company 1%

Iran Insurance Company 1%

Eurasian Economy Tadbirgaran Company 1%

Brokerage of BMI

Currency Exchange Company of BMI

Pouya Pioneer Capital Development Corporation

Pouya Future Design and Development Company

See also

Bank Markazi Iran
Mir Business Bank in Russia
Economy of Iran
Islamic Banking
Banking and Insurance in Iran

References

External links

Bank Meli Web site (Persian)
Bank Melli Web site (English)
Bank Melli official page on Instagram
State owned banks of Iran
The Banker, "The start of an economic renaissance", 2006, available to registered users and subscribers
Reuters – Iran sanctions
AFP – Iran to shake up interest rates

Companies listed on the Tehran Stock Exchange
Banks established in 1927
1927 establishments in Iran
Banks of Iran
Former central banks
Iranian entities subject to the U.S. Department of the Treasury sanctions